Eight Thirty (March 27, 1936 – April 7, 1965) was an American Hall of Fame  Thoroughbred racehorse. He was owned by George D. Widener, Jr. and bred by his Erdenheim Farm. Widener is one of only five people ever named an Exemplar of Racing. Eight Thirty was a descendant of Fair Play, who had been purchased from the estate of August Belmont, Jr. by Widener's uncle, Joseph E. Widener.

Racing at age two in 1938, Eight Thirty won two important graded stakes races but was overshadowed by  William Ziegler Jr.'s  Champion 2-Yr-Old Colt El Chico.

In 1939, Eight Thirty started his three-year-old racing season slowly and did not enter any of the American Classic Races. However, competing in the East Coast racing scene along with greats such as Johnstown and Challedon, in one month alone, Eight Thirty won four straight important stakes races. He ended his season with seven wins out of his ten starts. Racing at age four and five, he won six of ten starts while setting a track record in his win in the 1940 Massachusetts Handicap.

Retired to stud duty at his owner's breeding farm, Eight Thirty proved to be a successful Stallion. He sired 44 stakes winners and was the damsire of 1962 Belmont Stakes winner Jaipur. Eight Thirty died on April 7, 1965.

Eight Thirty was inducted into the National Museum of Racing and Hall of Fame in 1994.

Pedigree

References
 Eight Thirty's pedigree and racing stats
 Fair Play at the United States' National Museum of Racing and Hall of Fame

1936 racehorse births
1965 racehorse deaths
Racehorses bred in Kentucky
Racehorses trained in the United States
United States Thoroughbred Racing Hall of Fame inductees
Widener family
Thoroughbred family 11-g
Chefs-de-Race